This is a list of archbishops of the Archdiocese of Gniezno, who are simultaneously primates of Poland since 1418. They also served as interrex in the Polish–Lithuanian Commonwealth.

From 1821 until 1946 in personal union with the Archdiocese of Poznań. 
From 1946 until 1992 in personal union with the Archdiocese of Warsaw.

List of archbishops
(999–after 1000) Radim Gaudentius 
(before 1025? – 1027) Hipolit
1027–1028 Bossuta Stefan
1076? – 1092 Bogumił
 ?   Heinrich von Wülzburg
(attested 1100–1112) Marcin
(attested 1136–1146/48) Jakub I ze Żnina
(1149–after 1167)	Jan Gryfita
(attested 1177–1180) Zdzisław I
(probably in 1180s.) Bogumilus
(attested from 1191 – died 1198/9) Piotr Łabędź
1199–1219 Henryk Kietlicz
1220–1232 Wincenty Niałek
1232–1258 Fulko I
1258–1271 Janusz Tarnowa
1271–1278 vacant
1278 Martin of Opava
1278–1283 vacant
1283–1314 Jakub Świnka
1314–1316 vacant
1316–1317 Borzysław I
1317–1341 Janisław I
1342–1374 Jarosław Bogoria
1374–1382 Janusz Suchywilk
1382–1388 Bodzęta z Kosowic
1389–1394 Jan Kropidło
1394–1401 Dobrogost z Nowego Dworu
1402–1411 Mikołaj I Kurowski
1412–1422 Mikołaj II Trąba (first primate of Poland since 1418)
1423–1436 Wojciech I Jastrzębiec
1437–1448 Wincenty II Kot
1449–1453 Władysław I Oporowski
1453–1464 Jan Odrowąż from Sprowa
1464–1473 Jan III Gruszczyński
1473–1480 Jakub III Siemieński
1481–1493 Zbigniew Oleśnicki 
1493–1503 Fryderyk Jagiellończyk
1503–1510 Andrzej I Boryszewski
1510–1531 Jan IV Łaski
1531–1535 Maciej I Drzewicki
1535–1537 Andrzej II Krzycki
1537–1540 Jan V Latalski
1541–1545 Piotr III Gamrat
1546–1559 Mikołaj III Dzierzgowski
1559–1562 Jan Przerębski
1562–1581 Jakub IV Uchański
1581–1603 Stanisław I Karnkowski
1604–1605 Jan VI Tarnowski
1606–1608 Bernard Maciejowski
1608–1615 Wojciech II Baranowski
1616–1624 Wawrzyniec Gembicki.
1624–1626 Henryk II Firlej
1627–1638 Jan VII Wężyk
1638–1641 Jan VIII Lipski
1641–1652 Maciej II Łubieński
1653–1658 Andrzej II Leszczyński
1659–1666 Waclaw Leszczyński
1666–1673 Mikołaj IV Prażmowski
1673–1674 Kazimierz Florian Czartoryski
1674–1677 Andrzej III Olszowski
1677–1679 vacant
1679–1685 Jan IX Stefan Wydźga
1685–1688 vacant
1688–1705 Michał Stefan Radziejowski
1706–1721 Stanisław II Szembek
1721–1723 vacant
1723–1738 Teodor Andrzej Potocki
1739–1748 Krzysztof Antoni Szembek
1749–1759 Adam Ignacy Komorowski
1759–1767 Władysław II Aleksander Łubieński
1767–1777 Gabriel Podoski
1777–1784 Antoni Kazimierz Ostrowski
1785–1794 Michał II Jerzy Poniatowski
1795–1801 Ignacy I Krasicki
1801–1806 vacant
1806–1818 
1818–1821 vacant
1821–1825 Tymoteusz Paweł Gorzeński
1825–1828 vacant
1828–1829 Teofil Cyprian Wolicki
1829–1831 vacant
1831–1842 Marcin II Sulgustowski–Dunin
1842–1845 vacant
1845–1865 Leon Michał Przyłuski
1866–1886 Mieczysław Halka Ledóchowski
1886–1890 Juliusz Józef Dinder
1891–1906 Florian Stablewski
1906–1914 vacant
1914–1915 Edward Likowski
1915–1926 Edmund Dalbor
1926–1948 August Józef Hlond
1948–1981 Stefan Wyszyński
1981–1992 Józef Glemp (Primate of Poland until 18 December 2009)
1992–2010 Henryk Muszyński (Primate of Poland from 18 December 2009)
2010–2014 Józef Kowalczyk
2014–present Wojciech Polak

Auxiliary bishops

1469–1474 Anton Nicolai
1509–? Mikołaj Mściwy
1527–1541 Jan Busiński
1541–1560 Sebastian Żydowski
1608–1627 Andrzej Wilczyński
1628–1638 Andrzej Gembicki, Appointed Bishop of Lutsk
1640–1644 Jan Madaliński
1644–1658 Adrian Grodecki
1660–1665 Gaspar Trizenieski
1667–1674 Jan Chrzciciel Bużeński
1676–1693 Wojciech Stawowski
1694–1700 Konstantyn Józef Zieliński, Appointed Archbishop of Lviv
1699–1718 Stefan Antonin Mdzewski

References

 List
Gniezno
Poland religion-related lists
Archbishops